U1 small nuclear ribonucleoprotein C is a protein that in humans is encoded by the SNRPC gene.

Interactions 

Small nuclear ribonucleoprotein polypeptide C has been shown to interact with Ewing sarcoma breakpoint region 1.

References

Further reading